Łewond (Armenian Ղեւոնդ) or Leontius was a late 8th-century Armenian priest and historian.

Very little is known about his life, except that he was an eyewitness to the events he describes after 774. His historical work was commissioned by Sapuh, son of Smbat VII Bagratuni, the presiding prince of Armenia in 761–775, and covers the years 632 to 789. It is an indispensable source for the early history of Arab rule over Armenia; indeed for the years 662–770 his account is the only testimony of note. It also contains important information on the Arab–Byzantine wars of the period. The work includes a letter supposedly sent by the Byzantine emperor Leo III the Isaurian to the Umayyad caliph Umar II that contains a defence of the Christian faith, but this version is a later Armenian composition.

References

Sources

Further reading
 

8th-century Armenian historians
Armenian priests
8th-century births
Year of death unknown